This is a list of political parties around the world who advocate for direct democracy.

Americas 

 Green Party (Brazil)
 Socialism and Liberty Party

None of the Above Direct Democracy Party
 Online Party of Canada
Pirate Party of Canada

Humanist Party
 Apruebo Dignidad (Coalition)
 Humanist Action
Democratic Revolution
Communist Party of Chile
Social Green Regionalist Federation
Christian Left of Chile
Social Convergence
Commons
Unite Movement
Common Force

 United States Pirate Party
 Green Party (United States)

 Green Animalist Party

 Fatherland for All

Asia 
 
 Brit Olam (National Team)

 No Party to Support
 The Assembly to Energize Japan
 The Party to Protect the People from NHK

Kurdistan Free Life Party

 
Syrian National Democratic Alliance
Democratic Union Party (Syria) 

 
Kurdistan Democratic Solution Party

Pakistan Green Party

Europe 

 The Greens – The Green Alternative

 Workers' Front
 Zagreb is OURS

 Dawn – National Coalition
 Freedom and Direct Democracy
 Public Affairs

 Europe Ecology – The Greens

 Change 2011
 Movement Now

 Freie Wähler
 dieBasis
 The Right
 National Democratic Party of Germany
 Democracy in Motion

 Party of Internet Democracy

Left-Green Movement
Humanist Party (Iceland)

 Direct Democracy Ireland

 Libertarian Municipal People

 Five Star Movement

 Internet Party
 Partido Pirata
 Podemos
  Galicia
 Land Party

Ecologist Greens

● Kukiz'15 
 Demokracja Bezpośrednia

● Party of Direct Democracy 

 Aktiv Demokrati
 Demoex (Democracy Experiment)
 Direktdemokraterna

 Left Party (Turkey)
 Kurdistan Workers Party
 Green Left Party

 Communist Workers' Organisation (UK)

Oceania 

 Flux

 Green Party of Aotearoa New Zealand

See also 
 Pirate Party
 Social ecology (Bookchin)
 Libertarian socialism

References 

Direct democracy parties
Direct democracy